Sessions may refer to:

 Sessions (surname), a surname
 Sessions (clothing company), an American apparel company
 Sessions Clock Company, an American clock manufacturer in the early 20th century

Arts, entertainment, and media
 Sessions (Beatles album), an unreleased compilation album by The Beatles
 Sessions (Fred Neil album)
 Sessions (compilation series), a series of DJ mix albums released by Ministry of Sound
 Sessions (Descendents EP), a 1997 EP by the punk rock band the Descendents
 Sessions (This Condition EP)
 Sessions@AOL, a special avenue of programming conducted by AOL Music

See also
 Session (disambiguation)
 The Sessions (disambiguation)